Burrini is an Italian surname. Notable people with the surname include:

Bruno Burrini (1931–2017), Italian alpine skier
Gino Burrini (1934–2022), Italian alpine skier, brother of Bruno
Giovanni Antonio Burrini (1656–1727), Italian painter 

Italian-language surnames